Korambayil Ahammed Haji Memorial Unity Women's College, is a women's degree college located in Manjeri, Malappuram district, Kerala. It was established in the year 1991. The college is affiliated with Calicut University. This college offers different courses in arts, commerce and science.

Accreditation
The college is  recognized by the University Grants Commission (UGC).

See also

References

External links

University of Calicut
University Grants Commission
National Assessment and Accreditation Council

Universities and colleges in Malappuram district
Educational institutions established in 1981
1981 establishments in Kerala
Arts and Science colleges in Kerala
Colleges affiliated with the University of Calicut